Arnold Ehrstein (also Arnu Eeskivi; 6 February 1898, Pärnu – 15 June 1946) was an Estonian politician. He was a member of II Riigikogu. He was a member of the Riigikogu since 31 December 1924. He replaced August Männikson.

References

1898 births
1946 deaths
People from Pärnu
People from Kreis Pernau
Workers' United Front politicians
Members of the Riigikogu, 1923–1926
Russian military personnel of World War I
Estonian military personnel of the Estonian War of Independence
Recipients of the Cross of Liberty (Estonia)